Welleda Veschi (born 23 June 1943) is an Italian former swimmer. She competed in the women's 400 metre freestyle at the 1960 Summer Olympics.

References

1943 births
Living people
Italian female swimmers
Olympic swimmers of Italy
Swimmers at the 1960 Summer Olympics
Swimmers from Rome
Italian female freestyle swimmers